Ángeles blancos (English title: White angels) is a Mexican telenovela produced by Carlos Sotomayor for Televisa in 1990.

Jacqueline Andere, Rogelio Guerra and Alfonso Iturralde starred as protagonists, while Queta Lavat, Héctor Gómez and Antonio Medellín starred as antagonists. Ignacio López Tarso starred as stellar performance.

Plot 
Rocío Díaz de León is committed to Augusto, a Formula 2 driver. The two are married, but during their honeymoon in New York, the couple is the victim of a robbery and Augusto dies.

On the other hand, we have Jorge Pades, a pilot who has a heart attack during a flight from New York to the city of Mexico. Luckily, dew, who is a cardiologist, at the airport and given first aid, which save his life in the hospital.

Jorge and Rocío arises a difficult love, because he is already married to Martha. George recovers, but understands that his life is in danger and only a transplant could save him. Stays in the clinic of the perfect Doctor Diaz, father of dew, and you can do the delicate operation. However, while waiting for a donor, Jorge suffered a second heart attack.

Cast 

 Jacqueline Andere as Rocío de los Ángeles Ponce de León
 Rogelio Guerra as Jorge Pades
 Ignacio López Tarso as Perfecto Díaz de León
 Alfonso Iturralde as Augusto
 Antonio Medellín as Dr. Cardoso
 Carmelita González as Dolores
 Queta Lavat as Brígida
 Sonia Furió as Ana María
 Serrana as Martha
 Begoña Palacios as Emilia
 Myrrah Saavedra as Lucía
 Juan Carlos Bonet as Daniel
 Luis Uribe as Luis
 Gina Romand as Elena
 Irán Castillo as Biela
 Hugo Acosta as Eugenio
 Angélica Vale as Priscilla
 Queta Carrasco as Josefita
 Héctor Gómez as Dr. Guzmán
 Irma Dorantes as Tina
 Mauro Giuntti as Luciano Ferrer
 Esther Guílmain as Guadalupe
 Emma Laura as Gabriela
 Ariadne Pellicer as Malena
 Juan Felipe Preciado as Humberto
 Luis Rivera as Milburgo
 José Suárez as Álvaro
 Karen Sentíes as Adriana
 Jorge Patiño as Antonio Fajardo
 María Cristina Ribal as Herminia
 Lucía Irurita as Carmelita
 Tara Parra as Remedios

Awards

References

External links 

1990 telenovelas
Mexican telenovelas
1990 Mexican television series debuts
1991 Mexican television series endings
Spanish-language telenovelas
Television shows set in Mexico
Televisa telenovelas